Signe Toly Anderson (born Signe Toly; September 15, 1941 – January 28, 2016) was an American singer who was one of the founding members of the American rock band Jefferson Airplane.

Early life
Anderson was born Signe Toly in Seattle, Washington on September 15, 1941. At age three, her parents divorced, and she moved with her mother to Portland, Oregon, where she was raised. Anderson sang in a band with three male musicians whom she had known in high school under the name Three Guys and a Gal. The group performed at a campaign event for John F. Kennedy in November 1959.

Jefferson Airplane
Anderson was a locally known and well-respected jazz and folk singer in San Francisco, where Marty Balin heard her perform and invited her to join his band, soon named Jefferson Airplane.

Soon after joining the Airplane, she married one of the Merry Pranksters, Jerry Anderson, a marriage that lasted from 1965 to 1974. She sang on the first Jefferson Airplane album Jefferson Airplane Takes Off, most notably on the song "Chauffeur Blues". Anderson distrusted the Airplane's original manager Matthew Katz and refused to sign a contract with him until he inserted a special escape clause freeing her from him if she left the band for any reason.

In July 1966, Anderson informed Bill Graham that she was quitting the band after a series of shows they were playing in Chicago, realizing that bringing her newborn child, with then-husband Jerry Anderson, on the road was not feasible. Graham, however, asked her to stay with the band through the October shows at the Winterland Ballroom in San Francisco, to which she agreed. This gave the band time to search for her successor, eventually choosing Grace Slick after Sherry Snow declined their offer. Allegedly there were other factors, such as the hostility of other band members toward her husband.

Anderson's last live performances with Jefferson Airplane were two sets on October 15, 1966, at The Fillmore. Both performances were recorded (as were most Fillmore shows) and have surfaced on some bootleg albums. At what seemed to be the end of the second set, Marty Balin announced that Anderson was leaving the group. Her farewell to the audience was: "I want you all to wear smiles and daisies and box balloons. I love you all. Thank you and goodbye." At several fans' requests, Anderson and the band performed her signature number "Chauffeur Blues". They finished the night with "High Flying Bird". In August 2010, Collector's Choice music in cooperation with Sony released this show as Live at The Fillmore Auditorium 10/15/66: Late Show – Signe's Farewell.

Later life
After leaving the Airplane, Anderson returned to Oregon, where she sang for nine years with Carl Smith and the Natural Gas Company. In the mid-1970s, she recovered from cancer. In 1977 she married local building contractor Michael Alois Ettlin, and continued to sing with Carl Smith.

In the mid-1990s, Anderson suffered more health problems, including a broken neck and bypass surgery, which led to serious financial problems for her family. She made guest appearances with the KBC Band and Jefferson Starship. Anderson's husband Michael Alois Ettlin died at the age of 62 on February 21, 2011.

Death
Anderson died at her home in Beaverton, Oregon, at the age of 74 on January 28, 2016, from the effects of chronic obstructive pulmonary disease (COPD). She died a few hours after Jefferson Airplane co-founder Paul Kantner died, also at age 74.

Her former bandmate Jorma Kaukonen wrote a public tribute honoring her, stating: "Signe was one of the strongest people I have ever met. She was our den mother in the early days of the Airplane...a voice of reason on more occasions than one… an important member of our dysfunctional little family. I always looked forward to seeing her when we played the Aladdin in Portland. She never complained and was always a joy."

References

External links
 Anderson's biography of the Jefferson Airplane website

1941 births
2016 deaths
American women rock singers
Jefferson Airplane members
Musicians from Portland, Oregon
Deaths from chronic obstructive pulmonary disease
Respiratory disease deaths in Oregon
20th-century American women singers
20th-century American singers